Farzana Faruk Jhumu (born 1998, Bangladesh) is a climate activist from Fridays for Future, Bangladesh. She is a youth currently living in Dhaka, Bangladesh.

Early life and education 
Farzana lived her early years in the Lakshmipur district. She is a computer science and engineering graduate. Her thesis project on her undergraduate degree was about a mental health issue, suicidal ideation detection.

She is a co-founder of Kaathpencil, an organization for teaching the unprivileged children of her area. They work on blood donation, children’s education, and climate education. Currently Poribesher Proti Projonmo (Generation for Environment) is an ongoing campaign with several organizations to educate children and young people about climate change and how to fight them.

Farzana's journey against the climate crisis started in 2017 with cleaning plastic from the neighborhood. She joined Fridays for Future, Bangladesh, in 2019. As Bangladesh is a severely affected country and Dhaka is one of the densely polluted cities, she started to engage with climate activism. Since early 2020, she has been organizing, handling social media, and communicating for Fridays for Future Bangladesh. In 2021 she was also being in part of Fridays for Future MAPA.

She joined COP26 as an observer. She was on the sailing ship of Greenpeace called “Rainbow Warrier” with other activists from MAPA. She is also working with the Fossil fuel Non-proliferation treaty to advocate the just transition from fossil fuel. She is working on the demand for reparation.

Works 

 Thunberg, Greta; Calderón, Adriana; Jhumu, Farzana Faruk; Njuguna, Eric (2021-08-19). "Opinion | This Is the World Being Left to Us by Adults". The New York Times. ISSN 0362-4331. Retrieved 2022-05-16.

References 

Bangladeshi people
People from Dhaka
Climate activists
1998 births
Living people